Josh Thewlis (born 30 April 2002) is an English rugby league footballer who plays as a  or er for the Warrington Wolves in the Super League.

Background
Thewlis was born in Oldham, Greater Manchester, England.
Played amateur rugby league for Waterhead Warriors.
He is of Irish descent.

Career
Thewlis made his Super League debut for Warrington in their 34–4 victory over the Catalans Dragons in round 17 of the 2019 Super League season.

References

External links
Warrington Wolves profile

2002 births
Living people
England Knights national rugby league team players
English rugby league players
Rugby league fullbacks
Rugby league players from Oldham
Warrington Wolves players